The Guntur International Poetry Festival (Telugu: గుంటూరు అంతర్జాతీయ కవితోత్సవం), also known as GIPF, is a literary festival which takes place annually in the Indian city Guntur, Andhra Pradesh. Gopichand Paruchuri & Nagasuseela Panchumarthi are the founders and organisers of the festival

History

GIPF is an annual non-profit, zero registration fee, invitation only poetry recitation event conducted to encourage budding and enthusiastic poets from India and abroad since 2008 by Poets and Lecturers Gopichand Paruchuri & Nagasuseela Panchumarthi. Invitation to recite poem in the event is inaugurated every year according to the programme calendar released around the month of March. After scrutiny of the entries by the panel, shortlisted poets are invited for the Festival to present the poems to the fest audience. GIPF usually falls on (or) around the International Day of Peace i.e. on 21 September, as themes of poems are predominantly in the backdrop of Peace, Human Values & Non-Violence. Poets recite poems which were selected by the jury in the day session which would later be published in Fest Anthology. Later in the evening Poets recite poems in their Vernacular Languages under the candle lit lights as a mark of solidarity to the victims of Violence in all forms. Last Poetry Festival was held on September 20 and 21, 2019 attended by poets from the United Kingdom, Poland, India, Maldives, the United States, Philippines and Bhutan.

Notable participants in 12th GIPF 2019
The following notable poets and literary personalities participated in the 2019 Guntur International Poetry Festival.

 Renata Cygan
 Agnieszka Jarzębowska 
 Ryszard Grajek
 Anna Czachorowska
 Izabela Zubko
 Sagar Kataria
 Bozena Helena Mazur Nowak
 Dr. Lanka Siva Rama Prasad
 Alicja Kuberska
 Eden S. Trinidad
 K. V. Dominic
 Pramila Khadun
 Nehabhandarkar

2020 edition of GIPF

In 2020 Due to COVID situation 13th edition of GIPF  was conducted virtually on 7–12 July 2020 in which more than 200 poets recited poems dedicated to COVID frontline workers and victims of COVID.

See also 

 Literary festival
 List of literary festivals in India

References

External links 
Official Website

Literary festivals in India
Literary festivals in Asia